Eden Shamir (born 25 June 1995) is an Israeli professional footballer who plays as a midfielder for Israeli Premier League club Hapoel Be'er Sheva.

Early life
Shamir was born in Kiryat Motzkin, Israel.

Career

Hapoel Be'er Sheva
On 19 June 2019, Shamir concluded at Hapoel Be'er Sheva for four years. On 11 July, Shamir made his debut in Hapoel Be'er Sheva uniforms in a 1–1 draw against Laçi as part of the UEFA Europa League at Laçi Stadium. On 25 August, Shamir made his debut in the Israeli Premier League in a 0–0 draw against the Beitar Jerusalem at Teddy Stadium. On 5 October, Shamir scored his first goal in the Israeli Premier League in a 3–0 victory over Hapoel Haifa at Sammy Ofer Stadium.

Standard Liège
In January 2020, Shamir joined Belgian club Standard Liège on a 1.8 million euro transfer fee, signing a 3.5 year contract.

Loan to Maccabi Tel Aviv
On 11 August 2021, Shamir was loaned to Maccabi Tel Aviv. At the end of the 2021–22 Israeli Premier League season, Shamir returned to parent club Standard Liège, after scoring eight times in 23 games in all competitions, sitting on the bench more than he expected.

After returning from loan, Shamir played in the second half of a pre-season friendly against Go Ahead Eagles, scoring and assisting, helping the team win 5–1.

International career 
He has been a youth international since 2011. In 2015, he was selected for the first time with Israel under-21s.

He was first called-up for the senior Israel national team in October 2021, during their 2022 FIFA World Cup qualifiers - UEFA.

Career statistics

Honours
Ironi Kiryat Shmona
 Israel State Cup: 2013–14
 Israel Super Cup: 2015

References

External links
Eden Shamir at Israel Football Association
Eden Shamir at Soccerway

1995 births
Living people
Israeli footballers
Hapoel Ironi Kiryat Shmona F.C. players
Hapoel Be'er Sheva F.C. players
Standard Liège players
Maccabi Tel Aviv F.C. players
Israeli Premier League players
Belgian Pro League players
Israeli expatriate footballers
Expatriate footballers in Belgium
Israeli expatriate sportspeople in Belgium
Footballers from Kiryat Motzkin
Association football wingers
Association football forwards